Gornja Bela Reka may refer to:
 Gornja Bela Reka (Zaječar), a village in Zaječar Municipality, Serbia
 Gornja Bela Reka (Nova Varoš), a village in Nova Varoš Municipality, Serbia

See also  
 Donja Bela Reka (disambiguation)
 Bela Reka (disambiguation)